Albonectria rigidiuscula is a fungal plant pathogen. The anamorph of A. rigidiuscula the fungus Fusarium decemcellulare is associated with inflorescence wilt and vascular necrosis in fruit tree crops such as Mango (Mangifera indica), Longan (Dimocarpus longan) and Rambutan (Nephelium lappaceum). F. decemcellulare causes a disease known as cushion gall in Theobroma cacao and other tropical trees.

References

Fungal plant pathogens and diseases
Nectriaceae
Fungi described in 1873
Taxa named by Miles Joseph Berkeley
Taxa named by Christopher Edmund Broome